Qaleh Now (also Romanized as Qal`eh Now) is a village in Juqin Rural District, in the Central District of Shahriar County, Tehran Province, Iran. At the 2006 census, its population was 112, in 23 families.

References 

Populated places in Shahriar County